The Mildura Country Music Festival was an annual Australian country music festival based in Mildura, Victoria. The 1994 event was held in October, which the Australian Country Music Ambassador, Kelly Tassone felt was "fast becoming a favourite festival
with performers." In 2005 it was sponsored by Telstra Countrywide. It focused on independent country music artists (about 95 percent of performers in the Australian country music industry).

This festival has been virtual since 2020.

Winners

Much of the Festival is free and a live concert and radio presentation of the Australian Independent Country Music Awards, recognising the achievements of independent recording artists. Previous Independent Country Music Awards finalists and winners include:
Kate Ballantyne
Vanya
Darren Coggan
Michael O'Rourke
Dianna Corcoran
Carter & Carter
Brendon Walmsley (1999)
Allan Caswell
Angus Gill
Aleyce Simmonds
Luke O'Shea

Performers have included:
Felicity Urquhart
Craig Giles
Peter Horan
Tracy Coster
Reg Poole
Glenn Jones
Fisk & Cristian
Pater Pratt
Owen Blundell
Terry Gordon
Sweeney Killeen
Michael King
Carter & Carter
Kiara Rodrigues

See also

List of country music festivals
List of folk festivals
Country music

References

External links

Folk festivals in Australia
Music festivals established in 1982
Festivals in Victoria (Australia)
Country music festivals in Australia
1982 establishments in Australia
Mildura